Sokinochloa is a genus of flowering plants belonging to the family Poaceae.

Its native range is Madagascar.

Species
Species:

Sokinochloa australis 
Sokinochloa bosseri 
Sokinochloa brachyclada 
Sokinochloa chapelieri 
Sokinochloa chiataniae 
Sokinochloa perrieri 
Sokinochloa viguieri

References

Bambusoideae
Bambusoideae genera